Chanda Fort Railway Station (station code: CAF) is one of the two main railway stations serving Chandrapur city in Chandrapur district in Maharashtra state in India. It is under Nagpur SEC railway division of South East Central Railway zone of Indian Railways. It is located on Gondia–Nagbhid–Balharshah line of Indian Railways.

It is located at 191 m above sea level and has a single platform. , 10 trains stop at this station.

History
The –Nagbhir– line was opened for traffic in 1908. The Nagbhir–Rajoli line was opened in 1913 and extended up to Chanda Fort. Work for conversion to broad gauge of the  narrow-gauge Gondia–Chanda Fort line started in December 1992. The fourth phase covering Nagbhir–Chanda Fort section was opened on 13 January 1999 and the Chanda Fort–Balharshah section was opened from 2 July 1999.

The Ramagundam–Balharshah–Wardha–Nagpur sector was electrified in 1988–89. The Gondia–Nagbhir–Balharshah line was electrified in 2018.

Amenities
Amenities at Chandrapur Fort railway station include: computerized reservation office and a waiting room.

References

External links
 Arrivals at Chanda Fort India Rail Info

Nagpur SEC railway division
Railway stations in Chandrapur district